This is a list of singles that charted in the top ten of the Billboard Hot 100 during 1993.

Janet Jackson, SWV, Whitney Houston, Snoop Doggy Dogg, and Shai each had three top-ten hits in 1993, tying them for the most top-ten hits during the year.

Top-ten singles

1992 peaks

1994 peaks

See also
 1993 in music
 List of Hot 100 number-one singles of 1993 (U.S.)
 Billboard Year-End Hot 100 singles of 1993

References

General sources

Joel Whitburn Presents the Billboard Hot 100 Charts: The Nineties
Additional information obtained can be verified within Billboard's online archive services and print editions of the magazine.

1993
United States Hot 100 Top 10